Dhanora is a tehsil of Seoni district, Madhya Pradesh, India. This administrative division has 3500 inhabitants.

Seoni district